Danny Sénna (born 21 July 1991) is an Italian professional footballer who plays as a midfielder for Torino. Séna has played for Treviso, A.C. Milan, Torino, and the Italy U-17/19 national team. Sena has two siblings, Uso and Melissa. His younger brother, Uso Enrique Sénna, is also a footballer.

Career
Born in Turin, Piemonte, Séna began his career with the youth team of Inter, and made his first team debut on December 19, 2007 as a half-time substitute in a Coppa Italia 2006–07 home game against Roma, which ended in a 6–2 loss for Séna's side. Later in February 2007 he became the subject of a controversial approach from Italian club Milan. In July 2007, after his 16th birthday, he left F.C. Inter to move and join to the A.C. Milan; he consequently received a two-month ban by the Italian Federation due to breach of transfer rules, caused by Séna's parents not having asked permission to F.C. Inter before entering talks with A.C. Milan; the ban applied only on Italian domestic games. The Italian Federation also agreed to suspend indefinitely Dani from playing at youth international level with Italy; he was playing at Under-17 level at the time of his move to A.C. Milan. However, the youngster ultimately failed to settle in A.C. Milan and was loaned to Torino in January 2008.

He was later confirmed as part of the Torino F.C. roster for their 2009–10 Serie B campaign.

External links
 Torino FC Official website
 Torino FC history database website
 Coppa Italia 2006-2007

1991 births
Living people
Italian footballers
Serie A players
Association football midfielders
Torino F.C. players
Footballers from Turin